The 1878 Perth by-election was fought on 29 January 1878.  The byelection was fought due to the succession to a peerage of the incumbent Liberal MP, Arthur Kinnaird.  It was won by the Liberal candidate Charles Stuart Parker.

References

1878 elections in the United Kingdom
1878 in Scotland
1870s elections in Scotland
Politics of Perth, Scotland
Politics of Perth and Kinross
By-elections to the Parliament of the United Kingdom in Scottish constituencies